The men's 500 metres races of the 2013–14 ISU Speed Skating World Cup 5, arranged in Eisstadion Inzell, in Inzell, Germany, was held on 8 and 9 March 2014.

Ronald Mulder of the Netherlands won the race on Saturday, while Gilmore Junio of Canada came second, and Nico Ihle of Germany came third. David Bosa of Italy won the Division B race.

Jan Smeekens of the Netherlands won the Sunday race, while Nico Ihle of Germany came second, and Michel Mulder of the Netherlands came third. Artur Waś of Poland won the second Division B race.

Race 1
Race one took place on Saturday, 8 March, with Division B scheduled in the morning session, at 10:10, and Division A scheduled in the afternoon session, at 13:59.

Division A

Division B

Race 2
Race two took place on Sunday, 9 March, with Division B scheduled in the morning session, at 10:30, and Division A scheduled in the afternoon session, at 13:30.

Division A

Division B

References

Men 0500
5